The British Indian Ocean Territory Police serve in the British Indian Ocean Territory (BIOT) (situated in the Indian Ocean halfway between Tanzania and Indonesia). BIOT is a territory which does not have a permanent civil population, like most British Overseas Territories. The population are mostly members of the British Armed Forces and United States Armed Forces.

As such the BIOT police consists of Royal Overseas Police Officers (ROPO), that are all currently members of either the Royal Marines or Royal Navy.

Organisation
The BIOT police (as of 2015) consists of:

 Senior Police Officer (ROPO 1) (Royal Navy Master at Arms or Royal Marine Colour Sergeant with Special Investigations Branch (SIB) experience) who acts as: the senior police person for the island,  Primary Liaison Officer between international police forces, superintendent of prisons, senior officer in charge of supervision of ROPOs and provide reassurance to the island community regarding police and criminal activity. He/she is responsible to the BIOT Commissioner
 Assistant Senior Police Officer (ROPO 2) (Royal Navy Senior Rate) who assists ROPO 1 with his/her duties. He/she is SIB and CSI trained.
 ROPO 3 - Royal Navy Police Senior Rate. (SIB experience and CSI trained).
 ROPO 4 - Royal Navy Police Senior Rate.
 ROPO 5 - Royal Military Police Corporal, female.
 ROPO 6 - Royal Air Force Police Corporal, dog handler.
 ROPO 7 - Royal Marines Police Corporal/Lance Corporal.
 ROPO 8 - Royal Navy Police Leading Regulator, female.
 ROPO 9 - Royal Navy Police Leading Regulator.
 ROPO 10 - Royal Marines Police Corporal/Lance Corporal

Duties

The duties of the ROPOs are typical of service police, but also act as customs officers for the island of Diego Garcia in the British Indian Ocean Territory, as well as prison officers, as the Senior Police Officer acts as 'superintendent of prisons'.

The offences dealt with by BIOT police have included:

Road Traffic Offences (Inc Fixed Penalty Notices)
Sexual Offences
Offences Against the Person
Drug Abuse/Misuse Statutory Offences
Theft/Fraud
Criminal Damage
Burglary
Public Order/Drunk Disorderly
illegal fishing Activity
Fire Arms/Ammunition
MDA/Importation
Special Investigation – Sudden Death

Uniform and vehicles

The ROPOs have epaulettes with collar numbers to identify them, similar to UK civilian police uniforms. 
BIOT police use 4x4/SUV vehicles to patrol and respond to emergencies, they are painted with the typical British Battenburg Pattern and have "BIOT POLICE" markings on the vehicles.

Dog Unit (K-9)

The BIOT Police also has a dog unit (also known as K-9) that provides support to other ROPOs.

United States Navy presence
The United States Navy (USN) has Naval Support Facility at East Point Plantation and entry to it needs a police permit.

See also
British Indian Ocean Territory topics
Law enforcement in the United Kingdom
List of UK police forces - overseas territories

References

External links
 BIOT—British Indian Ocean Territory Customs

Government of the British Indian Ocean Territory
Police forces of British Overseas Territories and Crown Dependencies
British Indian Ocean Territory people